Demetriola levis is a species of beetle in the family Carabidae, the only species in the genus Demetriola.

References

Lebiinae